Torrinch or Inchtore is a wooded island in Loch Lomond in Scotland. The name Torremach is also recorded for it.

Geography 
It is one of the smaller islands in the loch. Torrinch, along with Inchmurrin, Creinch, and Inchcailloch, forms part of the Highland Boundary Fault. In the 1800s it was covered with oaks.

It lies just to the south-west of the larger island of Inchcailloch, and north-east of Creinch.

Footnotes

External links 
short article on the island
 

Islands of Loch Lomond
Highland Boundary Fault
Uninhabited islands of West Dunbartonshire
Loch Lomond National Nature Reserve